Sir Edward Maynard Des Champs Chamier KCSI, KCIE (4 June 1866 – 17 November 1945) was a British Indian judge and the first Chief Justice of the Patna High Court.

Career
Sir Edward Chamier passed Indian Civil Service.  He was knighted on 1 January 1916 and was appointed the Chief Justice of the Patna High Court on 1 March 1916 and retired on 30 October 1917. During this tenure he set up an example of judicial autonomy at the time of inaugurating the High Court building in 1916. In the opening ceremony Justice Chamier neither invited Lieutenant Governor of the province Sir Edward Albert Gait nor even Viceroy Lord Hardinge.

Chamier was legal adviser to the Secretary of State for India in 1925–26.

References

1866 births
1945 deaths
20th-century English judges
British India judges
Chief Justices of the Patna High Court
Knights Commander of the Order of the Star of India
Indian Civil Service (British India) officers
Knights Bachelor
People educated at Haileybury and Imperial Service College
Members of the Inner Temple